Crooks is a city in Minnehaha County, South Dakota, United States and is a suburb of Sioux Falls. The population was 1,362 at the 2020 census.  Crooks was named New Hope until 1904. The town's present name honors W. A. Crooks, a local politician.

Geography
Crooks is located at  (43.661488, -96.809148).

Crooks has been assigned the ZIP code 57020 and the FIPS place code 14740.

Demographics

2010 census
As of the census of 2010, there were 1,269 people, 431 households, and 345 families living in the city. The racial makeup of the city was 98.2% White, 0.1% Native American, 0.2% Asian, 0.5% from other races, and 1.1% from two or more races. Hispanic or Latino of any race were 2.0% of the population.

There were 431 households, of which 48.0% had children under the age of 18 living with them, 66.6% were married couples living together, 10.9% had a female householder with no husband present, 2.6% had a male householder with no wife present, and 20.0% were non-families. 15.3% of all households were made up of individuals, and 3.8% had someone living alone who was 65 years of age or older. The average household size was 2.94 and the average family size was 3.29.

The median age in the city was 31.4 years. 32.9% of residents were under the age of 18; 5.8% were between the ages of 18 and 24; 32.6% were from 25 to 44; 24.1% were from 45 to 64; and 4.6% were 65 years of age or older. The gender makeup of the city was 50.7% male and 49.3% female.

2000 census
As of the census of 2000, there were 859 people, 282 households, and 232 families living in the city. The population density was 1,324.3 people per square mile (510.2/km2). There were 289 housing units at an average density of 445.6 per square mile (171.7/km2). The racial makeup of the city was 98.14% White, 1.05% Native American, 0.23% Asian, and 0.58% from two or more races.

There were 282 households, out of which 54.3% had children under the age of 18 living with them, 70.6% were married couples living together, 8.9% had a female householder with no husband present, and 17.7% were non-families. 13.1% of all households were made up of individuals, and 3.9% had someone living alone who was 65 years of age or older. The average household size was 3.05 and the average family size was 3.38.

In the city, the population was spread out, with 34.3% under the age of 18, 9.2% from 18 to 24, 34.2% from 25 to 44, 19.0% from 45 to 64, and 3.3% who were 65 years of age or older. The median age was 30 years. For every 100 females, there were 100.2 males. For every 100 females age 18 and over, there were 98.6 males.

As of 2000 the median income for a household in the city was $54,583, and the median income for a family was $56,528. Males had a median income of $31,065 versus $25,064 for females. The per capita income for the city was $17,512. About 0.8% of families and 1.7% of the population were below the poverty line, including 1.0% of those under age 18 and 4.3% of those age 65 or over.

References

Cities in South Dakota
Cities in Minnehaha County, South Dakota
Sioux Falls, South Dakota metropolitan area